Chaetostomella stigmataspis is a species of tephritid or fruit flies in the genus Chaetostomella of the family Tephritidae.

Distribution
Russia, China, Korea, Japan.

References

Tephritinae
Insects described in 1830
Diptera of Asia